Lantråd is the title of the Head of Government of the Åland Islands in Finland. The person holding the office leads its regional government.

The current Lantråd is Veronica Thörnroos.


List 
List of Premiers of the Åland Islands (1922–Present):
Carl Björkman (1922–1938) 
Viktor Strandfält (1938–1955) 
Hugo Johansson (1955–1967) 
Martin Isaksson (1967–1972) 
Alarik Häggblom (1972–1979) 
Folke Woivalin (1979–1988) 
Sune Eriksson (1988–1991) 
Ragnar Erlandsson (1991–1995) 
Roger Jansson (1995–1999) 
Roger Nordlund (1999–2007) 
Viveka Eriksson (2007–2011) 
Camilla Gunell (2011–2015)
Katrin Sjögren (2015–2019)
Veronica Thörnroos (2019–present)

See also
Vice lantråd
Government of Åland
Parliament of Åland

References

External links
The Åland Government
The Åland Parliament

Politics of Åland